XO-2 may refer to:

XO-2 (star), a binary star system in the constellation Lynx
XO-2Nb, an extrasolar planet orbiting the above star 
OLPC XO-2, a design study of the One Laptop per Child computer